Whitleigh is a district area and is in the electoral Ward of Budshead of the city of Plymouth in the beautiful English county of Devon. It shares district borders with Southway, Honicknowle, Crownhill, West Park and St Budeaux. In the 2001 census the population of Whitleigh was 7,165, of which 48.2% were male and 51.8% were female.

Education 
Whitleigh's primary schools are Woodfield Primary School, St. Peter's Roman Catholic School, Whitleigh Community Primary School, and Woodland Community Special School. Sir John Hunt Community Sports College (formerly Community College, and previously Whitleigh comprehensive (or High) school) previously merged with Southway Community College due to budget cuts from the local government.

Whitleigh also houses the Woodside Education Centre. This institute is aimed at children with learning or serious physical disabilities. Children are accepted from 4–16 years old.

Wood View Learning Community 
Wood View Learning Community, is a new campus-styled community facility, that opened in 2010. It stands at the site of the previous school buildings on Lancaster Gardens. The site homes Sir John Hunt Community Sports College, Whitleigh Community Primary School and Woodlands Special School, as well other community services such as the Youth Centre. The aim of the campus, run by a federated Governing Body, is to bring together three schools to work together, and offer a high-quality education too all its students, and to act as a real hub within the community.

Sir John Hunt Community Sports College 
Sir John Hunt is the local secondary school that caters for all students aged 11 to 19. It is a relatively smaller school in comparison to others in the city, but can offer some of the best facilities now being part of the Wood View Campus. The college opened it first provisions for post-16 education, in the form of a Sixth Form in 2010, and is the last school in Plymouth to open a sixth form. The Sixth Form works in a consortium with Lipson Co-operative Academy and Tor Bridge High, where students from all three schools have the opportunity to study level 3 courses across the consortium.

Shopping 
Whitleigh Green is the predominant shopping precinct, which hosts a small supermarket(CO-OP), Take Away(Fish & Chip Shop), Cafe, Hair/Beauty Salon, Discount Store(Household & Gardening)),Bakery, Butchers(Closed), Newsagents, Post Office, Tattoo Parlour, and a Pharmacy. There is also a large area of grass and trees. Recycling facilities were removed from the car park area.

Religion 
The suburb has three churches. St Chad's Anglican church, Bethany Evangelical Church and a Salvation Army church and centre in Lancaster Gardens.

Recently, what was formerly the Whitleigh Christian Centre has now been re-opened as Engage Whitleigh. Engage Whitleigh is a Pentecostal church in fellowship with the Assemblies of God which is able to provide community-based conferencing facilities.

Fownes family 

Whitley was a seat of the Fownes family from the 17th century. John Fownes (1614–1646) of Whitley was the 4th son of Thomas Fownes (d.1638) of Plymouth, Mayor of Plymouth in 1619. He married Catherine Champernowne (d.1642/3), 5th daughter of Arthur Champernowne of Dartington. His son was John Fownes (1640–1670) of Whitley, who married Mary Northleigh (d.1669), a daughter of Henry Northleigh (1612–1675) of Peamore, Exminster by his wife  Lettice Yarde, daughter of Edward Yarde of Bradley, Devon. Their monument survives in St Budeaux Church inscribed as follows:
"In memorie of John Fownes of Whitley Esq: and of Mary his wife Daughter of Henry Northleigh of Peamore Esq: He dyed the 22nd day of Aprill 1670 ætatis 30, She dyed the 18th day of Aprill 1669 ætatis 28 Also Elizabeth their daughter dyed the 31 day of March 1669, Leavinge survivinge children John. Henry Katherine and Mary".
Their eldest son and heir was John Fownes (1661–1731) of Kittery Court, a Member of Parliament for Dartmouth 1713–14. His grandson was Henry Fownes Luttrell (1722–1780) (who adopted the additional surname of Luttrell) of Dunster Castle, Somerset, High Sheriff of Somerset from 1754 to 1755, and a Member of Parliament for the borough of Minehead from 1768 to 1774.

References 

Suburbs of Plymouth, Devon